Morte is a fictional character in the role-playing video game Planescape: Torment, voiced by Rob Paulsen. He appears as a sentient, levitating human skull with intact eyeballs. Morte accompanies the protagonist, The Nameless One, from early in the game as a party member. He serves as comic relief, and also provides a significant section of backstory. His offensive abilities consists of biting enemies as well as taunting his opponents. He has been overall very well received, and praised as one of the best sidekick characters in the PC gaming of that era.

Concept and design
The game's lead designer, Chris Avellone, described Morte as the player character's compass, encyclopedia, friend, and "resident jackass". Avellone said Morte's has gathered a large repertoire of insults over the centuries, he can taunt people to literally drop their guard and attack him relentlessly, which provides the player with further strategic opportunities. Morte is intentionally designed to be difficult for enemies to hit him, but packs a strong bite with his attacks in return. 

A running gag in Torment is Morte's fondness for female zombies. The game's initial project director Guido Henkel said: "Let's say you're trying to sneak out of an area, when all of a sudden there a female zombie shows up. Morte, our nice little sarcastic skull, has a total thing for female zombies. He just has to shack up with them. And although you are trying to sneak out somewhere, Morte will walk right up to the zombie and start talking her up. That, of course, destroys your whole plan because you have no control over his actions at that point."

Character biography

Morte is a "Chaotic good" floating human skull. Despite his lack of a body, he is a capable warrior in many respects, biting with his teeth and distracting foes with sarcastic taunts. His small size, lack of vital organs, and undead nature, protect him from attacks that would normally inflict serious wounds. It is shown that Morte and The Nameless One have something of a history together. His name is associated with the concept of "death" in the Latin language.

Morte is included in the party from the beginning of the game. He can help The Nameless One learn much about his previous incarnations, unless the player first removes Morte from the party. His taunts are useful as they prevent a fleeing character from escaping, and can also silence spell-casting characters, forcing them into melee combat. However, his taunts do not work on the undead, creatures possessing low intelligence, or creatures lacking wills of their own. Morte provides much of the game's humor, not the least being the random conversations between himself and the Nameless One, whom he calls "Chief".

Towards the end of the game, The Nameless One finds out where Morte came from; the Pillar of Skulls on the plane of Baator. Morte was pulled from the pillar by the Practical Incarnation. The pillar is composed of the skulls of all the people who died and have caused another to die through their lies. Morte is tormented by the fact that, prior to his death, he lied to the Good Incarnation that Ravel could make him immortal, and is thus responsible for The Nameless One's lamentable condition. If The Nameless One convinces Morte to reveal this history and forgives him, Morte becomes significantly stronger, his personal torment lessened.

Reception
The character was critically acclaimed upon the game's release. IGN gave Morte the 1999 Memorable Character of the Year award, stating that as an "unusual-looking character with a quirky personality to match, as well as some completely unique attacks and special abilities, he is impossible to forget, and also plays an essential role in making the entire game a memorable." Eurogamer gave him the Gaming Globes 2000 award in the category Male Supporting Character.

In 2000, GameSpot included him on their list of top ten video game sidekicks for "his unique interpretations of friendship and loyalty, and the strange brand of comic relief." In 2004, he barely "didn't make the cut" for a similar list by GameSpy, rejected for his awkward habit of "hitting it" on "other dead people." In 2008, Computer and Video Games ranked him as the sixth best character overall in PC gaming, writing that "amongst a pack of memorable characters, Morte is the one you love Planescape for" and contrasting him with Tommy from Prey. In 2011, Maximum PC listed him as one of 25 of gaming's best sidekicks, writing that: "whether he's chomping on your nearest foe, making lame pick-up attempts at your female party-mates, or cracking wise about his life as floating skull, Morte is head and shoulders—err, at least head, above other gaming sidekicks." In 2012, Complex ranked him as fourth on their list of top "pervs in games" for his "insatiable lust for the ladies, living or not."

In a 2017 article, PC Gamer staff included Morte in their definitive list of the best RPG squad mates around.

References

Dungeons & Dragons characters
Fantasy video game characters
Male characters in video games
Planescape
Role-playing video game characters
Undead characters in video games
Video game characters introduced in 1999
Video game sidekicks